Thierry De Cordier (born 1954 in Ronse, Belgium) is a contemporary visual artist. He currently lives and works in the Alpujarras, Spain.

His art consists of drawings, paintings, sculptures, installations and poetry/philosophy, and his work is held in numerous museum collections, including S.M.A.K.

His works may be seen in the Stedelijk Museum voor Actuele Kunst, the Centre Georges Pompidou and the Hirshhorn Museum and Sculpture Garden.

One-person exhibitions
 Iconotextures, Royal Museums of Fine Arts of Belgium, Brussels, Belgium (2016)
 Landschappen, BOZAR, Brussels, Belgium (2012)
 Xavier Hufkens, Brussels, Belgium (2009, 2011)
 Marian Goodman Gallery, Paris, France (2007)
 Inauguration of De Kapel van het Niets, Sint-Norbertuscentrum, Duffel, Belgium (2007)
 Works from the "Female Drawings" Group. Part I, Marian Goodman Gallery, New York, NY, USA (2006)
 Drawings, Centre Georges Pompidou, Paris, France (2004)
 Black Paintings, Marian Goodman Gallery, Paris, France (2003)
 Drawings, SMAK, Ghent, Belgium (1999)
 Belgian Pavilion at the Venice Biennale, Venice, Italy (1997)
 Drawings, Museum Kröller-Müller, Otterlo, the Netherlands (1997)
 Je suis le Monde, Zerynthia, Rome, Italy (1996)
 Xavier Hufkens, Brussels, Belgium (1995)
 Galerie des Beaux-Arts, Brussels, Belgium (1991)
 Galerie des Beaux-Arts, Brussels, Belgium (1989)
 Galleria Grazia Terrible, Milano, Italy (1988)
 Galerie Joost Declercq, Ghent, Belgium (1987)
 De Lege Ruimte, Bruges, Belgium (1987)

References

Thierry De Cordier at Artcyclopedia.com
Example of De Cordier's two-dimensional work
Article from Artforum
Articles about De Cordier

Further reading

Articles

External links
Official Home Page
 Thierry De Cordier at Venice Biennale, The Encyclopedic Palace
Thierry De Cordier at Xavier Hufkens, Brussels
Thierry De Cordier at Xavier Hufkens, 2011, Brussels
Thierry De Cordier at De Pont, Tilburg
Thierry De Cordier: Four Greeneries

Living people
Belgian contemporary artists
Belgian painters
Belgian sculptors
1954 births